A concubinatus (Latin for "concubinage" – see also concubina, "concubine", considered less pejorative than paelex, and concubinus, "man who lives with another with no legal marriage") was an institution of quasi-marriage between Roman citizens who for various reasons did not want to enter into a full marriage. The institution was often found in unbalanced couples, where one of the members belonged to a higher social class or where one of the two was freed and the other one was freeborn. However, it differed from a contubernium, where at least one of the partners was a slave.

In Roman law 
What legally differentiated a concubinage from a marriage was a lack of affectio maritalis ("marital affection"), which was the desire of having a legal spouse, raise their rank, make them their equal, or the corresponding intent from the other party involved. A person registered in a concubinatus was not allowed to have a spouse at the same time.

Emperor Augustus' Leges Juliae gave the first legal recognition of concubinage, defining it as cohabitation without marital status. Concubinatus came to define many relationships and marriages considered unsuitable under Roman customs, such a senator's desire to marry a freedwoman, or his cohabitation with a former prostitute. A quasi-marital relationship involving a Roman citizen and a foreigner was not considered a concubinage but was rather equated to a marriage between non-Romans (matrimonium juris gentium), without legal consequences except those deriving from the Jus gentium.

While any couple could live in a concubinage instead of entering into a marriage, they were compelled to give notice to the authorities. This type of cohabitation varied little from actual marriage, except that heirs from this union were not considered legitimate. Often this was the reason that men of high rank would live with a woman in concubinage after the death of their first wife; the claims of their children from the first marriage would not be challenged by their children from the later union.

Concubina 
The title of concubine was not considered derogatory (as it may be considered today) in ancient Rome, and was often inscribed on tombstones. Concerning the difference between a concubine and a wife, the jurist Julius Paulus wrote in his Opinions that "a concubine differs from a wife only in the regard in which she is held", meaning that a concubine was not considered a social equal to her patron, as his wife was.

Concubines did receive much protection under the law, even though they could not legally share their patron's social stature. They largely relied upon their patrons to provide for them. Early Roman law sought to differentiate between the status of concubinage and legal marriage, as demonstrated in a law attributed to Numa Pompilius, the second king of Rome, circa 716–673 BCE: "A concubine shall not touch the altar of Juno. If she touches it, she shall sacrifice, with her hair unbound, a ewe lamb to Juno"; this fragment gives evidence that concubines existed early in the Roman monarchy, but also notes the banning of their involvement in the worship of Juno, the goddess of marriage. Later the jurist Ulpian wrote on the Lex Julia et Papia, "Only those women with whom intercourse is not unlawful can be kept in concubinage without the fear of committing a crime". He also said that "anyone can keep a concubine of any age unless she is less than twelve years old".

Concubinus 
A masculine of concubine, concubinus, "man in a concubinage", "male-lover", was also regularly used in Latin, although it is attested less often than concubina. See, for instance, Tac. A. 13, 21: "Nunc per concubinum Atimetum et histrionem Paridem quasi scaenae fabulas componit." ("Now through her paramour, Atimetus, and the actor, Paris, she is, so to say, concocting a drama for the stage").

Polygamy 
Despite traditional Roman aversion against polygamy and the fact that according to the Roman law a man could not have a concubine while he had a wife, there are various notable occurrences of this, including the famous cases of the emperors Augustus, Marcus Aurelius, and Vespasian. Suetonius wrote that Augustus "put Scribonia [his second wife] away because she was too free in complaining about the influence of his concubine". Often, in return for payment, concubines would relay appeals to their emperor. This de facto polygamy – for Roman citizens could not legally marry or cohabit with a concubine while also having a legal wife – was "tolerated to the degree that it did not threaten the religious and legal integrity of the family".

See also
 Marriage in ancient Rome

References

Bibliography

Further reading 
 
 
 
 

 

Roman law
Polygamy
Concubinage
Marriage, unions and partnerships in ancient Rome